DKH may refer to:
 dKH, the degree of carbonate hardness of water
 Juneyao Airlines, ICAO airline designator